Bolek (died 1819), also spelled as Boleck or Bolechs, and known as Bowlegs by European Americans, was a Seminole principal chief, of the Alachua chiefly line.  He was the younger brother of King Payne, who succeeded their father Cowkeeper (known to the Seminole as Ahaya) as leading or principal chief in Florida. Bolek succeeded King Payne in 1812 when he was killed.

Early life and education
Bolek was one of several children born to Ahaya (Cowkeeper) and his wife.  He and his older brother King Payne were groomed by their mother's brother (in the matrilineal kinship system) to become chiefs and take leading roles among the Seminole. They inherited that role through their mother's people, who were descended from the Alachua chiefly line. 

Bolek was designated as a village or itwála chief while a young man; he was based near the Suwannee River of western Florida. He began to oppose United States influence in Spanish Florida during the early 19th century.  He prevented Georgia slaveholders from entering Seminole territory to pursue escaped slaves from the Low Country.  Some of the fugitives married into the Seminole people; most created independent communities nearby as allies and were known as Black Seminoles. They kept much of their Gullah culture and developed the Afro-Seminole Creole language in Florida, which they used through the 19th century.

In 1812, Bolek and his brother King Payne began raiding frontier settlements along the Florida-Georgia border.  Seminole bands fought several engagements with militia forces; Payne was killed in 1812, and Bolek suffered serious wounds during the same skirmish against Georgia militia forces under Daniel Newnan. An expedition by Colonel John Williams the following year destroyed hundreds of Seminole villages and captured numerous horses and cattle. Border warfare between the Seminole and Georgia settlers contributed to US involvement in the Creek War of 1813-1814.

Seminole Wars
During the First Seminole War, beginning in 1818, American forces under General Andrew Jackson advanced into northern Florida capturing Kinache's village of Miccosukee and occupying the British settlement of St. Marks before reaching Bolek's abandoned village. They captured two Englishman, Robert Ambrister and Peter Cook, who were taken back to St. Mark. Charged with assisting the Seminole, they were executed by American forces. Although this created an international incident, Jackson continued his offensive and recaptured Pensacola. 

The US purchased Florida from Spain in 1819, and the Seminole expected they would have more to do to try to keep the Americans from their territory. Bolek died that year and was succeeded as principal chief by his maternal grandnephew, Micanopy. 

Micanopy was principal chief through the move into central Florida and the Second Seminole War. He also led the Seminole to Indian Territory, realizing that trying to fight the US superior forces was finally futile. In the West, he worked to gain separate territory and independence for the Seminole from Creek oversight until his death in 1849. 

He was succeeded by his sister's son, John Jumper, who died in 1853. John's younger brother, Jim Jumper, succeeded as principal chief, leading the Seminole in Indian Territory until after the American Civil War, when the United States government began to interfere with tribal succession. 

Another member of the Cowkeeper dynasty was Billy Bowlegs.

References

Johansen, Bruce E. and Donald A. Grinde, Jr. The Encyclopedia of Native American Biography, New York: Henry Holt and Company, 1997.

18th-century births
1819 deaths
Chiefs of the Seminole
18th-century Seminole people
Native Americans of the Seminole Wars